Aidos Yerbossynuly (born 14 November 1991) is a Kazakhstani professional boxer.

Professional career
Yerbossynuly made his professional debut on 2 October 2015, scoring a first-round technical knockout (TKO) victory over Sergei Dologzhiev at the Circus in Lviv, Ukraine.

After compiling a record of 8–0 (7 KOs), he defeated Aliaksandr Sushchyts on 15 September 2018 at the Konys in Aktobe, Kazakhstan, capturing the vacant WBC-ABC Continental super-middleweight title by unanimous decision (UD) with the scorecards reading 100–90, 100–91 and 99–91. He captured the vacant WBO Global super-middleweight title in his next fight, defeating Ilias Achergui by fourth-round corner retirement (RTD) on 23 December 2018 at the Soviet Wings Sport Palace in Moscow, Russia. Yerbossynuly retained his WBC and WBO regional titles via UD against Lukas Ndafoluma on 24 March 2019, while also capturing the vacant WBA International super-middleweight title at the Almaty Arena in Almaty, Kazakhstan. He successfully defended his regional titles twice more in 2019; a UD over Rocky Jerkic in August and an eighth-round TKO against Omar Garcia in December.

Aidos faced David Morrell for the WBA (Regular) super-middleweight title on November 5, 2022. After losing the bout by knock out in the 12th round, Aidos was hospitalized and put into an induced coma due to a subdural hematoma, bleeding on the brain.

Professional boxing record

References

External links

Living people
1991 births
Kazakhstani male boxers
Super-middleweight boxers
People from Almaty Region
21st-century Kazakhstani people